The Sweden women's national under-20 basketball team is a national basketball team of Sweden, administered by the Swedish Basketball Federation. It represents the country in women's international under-20 basketball competitions.

FIBA U20 Women's European Championship participations

See also
Sweden women's national basketball team
Sweden women's national under-19 basketball team

References

External links
Archived records of Sweden team participations

Basketball in Sweden
B
Women's national under-20 basketball teams